Bni Sidel Louta (Tarifit: Bni Sidal Luṭa, ⴱⵏⵉ ⵙⵉⴷⴰⵍ ⵍⵓⵟⴰ; Arabic:  بني سيدال لوطا) is a commune in the Nador Province of the Oriental administrative region of Morocco. At the time of the 2004 census, the commune had a total population of 7331 people living in 1475 households.

References

Populated places in Nador Province
Rural communes of Oriental (Morocco)